Geralb Smajli (born 16 May 2002) is a Belgian–born Albanian professional footballer who plays as a right back for Kategoria Superiore club Vllaznia.

References

External links

Geralb Smajli profile FSHF.org

2002 births
Living people
People from Waregem
Albanian footballers
Albania youth international footballers
Belgian footballers
Belgian people of Albanian descent
Association football defenders
Shkëndija Tiranë players
KF Vllaznia Shkodër players
Kategoria Superiore players